Dəhnə is a village in the municipality of Çuxurəzəmi in the Davachi Rayon of Azerbaijan.

References

Populated places in Shabran District